Michael Blauensteiner (born 11 February 1995) is an Austrian professional footballer who plays as a defender for Austria Klagenfurt.

Career

Club career
Player belong to Austria Wien. He was loaned to TSV Hartberg, later to Sepsi OSK Sfântu Gheorghe. In July 2019, he was loaned out to Lithuanian Sūduva Marijampolė for the rest of 2019. After returning, he was registered for Austrias' reserve team, Young Violets.

On 15 July 2020, he agreed on a one-year contract with SKN St. Pölten.

Personal life
Blauensteiner was born in Austria to an Austrian father and Cuban mother.

References

External links
Michael Blauensteiner at OEFB

1995 births
Living people
Footballers from Vienna
Austrian footballers
Austria youth international footballers
Austrian people of Cuban descent
Association football midfielders
Austrian Football Bundesliga players
2. Liga (Austria) players
Austrian Regionalliga players
A Lyga players
FK Austria Wien players
TSV Hartberg players
FK Sūduva Marijampolė players
SKN St. Pölten players
SK Austria Klagenfurt players
Austrian expatriate footballers
Austrian expatriate sportspeople in Lithuania
Expatriate footballers in Lithuania